The 2005–06 Illinois Fighting Illini men's basketball team represented University of Illinois at Urbana–Champaign in the 2005–06 NCAA Division I men's basketball season.  This was head coach Bruce Weber's third season at Illinois. The team finished with 11–5 conference and 26–7 overall records. The Illini lost in its first game of the Big Ten tournament and were eliminated in the second round of the NCAA tournament.

Season

Overview
With the departure of junior Deron Williams and senior Luther Head to the NBA draft, returning seniors Dee Brown and James Augustine led Illinois back to the NCAA tournament. Brown took over the helm of the offense at point guard, a role he had played in high school.  As in the previous year, Illinois relied heavily upon three-point shooting, but with more of an emphasis upon the post play of James Augustine.

Roster

Depth chart

Schedule

|-
!colspan=12 style="background:#DF4E38; color:white;"| Exhibition

|-
!colspan=12 style="background:#DF4E38; color:white;"| Non-Conference regular season

|-
!colspan=9 style="background:#DF4E38; color:#FFFFFF;"|Big Ten regular season

|-
!colspan=9 style="text-align: center; background:#DF4E38"|Big Ten tournament

|-
!colspan=9 style="text-align: center; background:#DF4E38"|NCAA tournament

Season statistics

Team players drafted into the NBA

Awards and honors
Dee Brown was named to the Consensus All-American 2nd Team, the Associated Press 2nd team, the United States Basketball Writers Association 2nd team and the National Association of Basketball Coaches 2nd team for the 2005–06 season.

References

Illinois Fighting Illini
Illinois Fighting Illini men's basketball seasons
Illinois
Illinois
Illinois